Cannabis in Ivory Coast is illegal. The country produces some amount of low-grade cannabis for local and regional consumption.

Cultivation
Cannabis cultivation increased substantially in Ivory Coast following a "cocoa crisis" in 1989–1990 which disrupted prices for one of the country's largest exports. The same profit as is produced on 30 hectares of cocoa can be gained on 0.1 hectares of cannabis.

References

Ivory Coast
Drugs in Ivory Coast